The Emperor and His Brother is a 1981 Hong Kong wuxia film based on Louis Cha's novel The Book and the Sword. Produced by the Shaw Brothers Studio, the film was directed by Chor Yuen and starred Ti Lung, Jason Pai and Lo Lieh in the leading roles.

Plot
The Qianlong Emperor is not the legitimate successor to the throne since at birth he was exchanged with the Yongzheng Emperor's newborn daughter. He learns the truth when two senior members of the Red Flower Society, a subversive anti-government secret organisation, contact him years later, hoping that the emperor will help them in driving the Manchus away. To hide the truth about his heritage, the emperor orders the two men to be killed, although one of them escapes and is captured again later. The Red Flower Society's chief Chen Jialuo turns out to be Qianlong's younger brother, and the two of them develop a tenuous relationship as the society's members attempt to rescue their captured comrade. They unleash an elaborate plan to kidnap the emperor in exchange for their comrade, and hope to persuade the emperor to join their cause. When the exchange takes place, Qianlong must ultimately continue impersonating a Manchu in order to remain in power as ruler of the Qing Empire. Qianlong's chief lieutenant, Zhang Zhaozhong, is bound and determined to wipe out Chen Jialuo and the Red Flower Society. His opportunity comes when a martial arts contest is scheduled to be held.

Cast
Ti Lung as Chen Jialuo / Chen Shiguan
Jason Pai as Qianlong Emperor
Lo Lieh as Zhang Zhaozhong
Ku Feng as Zhou Zhongying
Wen Hsueh-erh as Zhou Qi
Sun Chien as Xu Tianhong
Chan Kei-kei as Luo Bing
Tang Wai-ho as Wen Tailai
Ku Kuan-chung as Yu Yutong
Mandy Wong as Li Yuanzhi
Wong Yung as Lu Feiqing
Yeung Chi-hing as Zhao Banshan
Kent Cheng as Yang Chengxie
Chun Wong as Zhang Jin
Linda Chu as Yu Ruyi
Liu Lai-ling as Bian Wenlian
Yau Chiu-ling as Wu Chanjuan
Kwan Fung as Taoist Wuchen
Ngai Fei as Wei Chunhua
Yuen Wah as Chang Bozhi
Wong Chi-ming as Shi Shuangying
Lau Fong-sai as Xinyan
Lee Kin-chung as Zhou Yingjie
Teresa Ha as Mrs Zhou
Lau Siu-kwan as Meng Jianxiong
Wong Ching-ho as Song Shanpeng
Jing Miao as Li Kexiu
Yuen Ban as Bai Zhen
Keung Hon as Wu Jiadong
Shum Lo as Ma Shanjun
Kam Kwan as Yu Wanting
Ng Hong-sang as Chou Hu
Yeung Hung as Chou Long
Lam Sung-cheng as Long Tianxing

References

External links

1981 films
1981 martial arts films
1981 action films
Hong Kong action films
Hong Kong martial arts films
Shaw Brothers Studio films
Films based on The Book and the Sword
Wuxia films
Films about rebels
Films directed by Chor Yuen
Films set in the Qing dynasty
1980s Mandarin-language films
1980s Hong Kong films